A forecast model or forecasting model may refer to
 the mathematical model used in forecasting, see Forecasting#Categories_of_forecasting_methods
 the specific, management-oriented FORECAST forecasting model